The 2014 American League Division Series were two best-of-five-game series to determine the participating teams in the 2014 American League Championship Series.  The Los Angeles Angels of Anaheim, Baltimore Orioles, and Detroit Tigers (divisional winners, seeded 1–3 based on regular season record) as well as the Wild Card game winning Kansas City Royals played in the two series. TBS carried all the games.

These matchups were:
 (1) Los Angeles Angels of Anaheim (West Division champions, 98–64) vs. (4) Kansas City Royals (Wild Card winner, 89–73): Royals win series 3–0.
 (2) Baltimore Orioles (East Division champions, 96–66) vs. (3) Detroit Tigers (Central Division champions, 90–72): Orioles win series 3–0.

This was the first postseason played under the current divisional alignment, going back to 1995, in which neither the Boston Red Sox nor the New York Yankees competed in an ALDS. It was also the Royals' first appearance in the current version of the ALDS, as their last previous postseason appearance had come in 1985, prior to its conception (although the team had played in one of the 1981 ALDS necessitated by that year's player strike and the resulting split season). It was also the Orioles' first ALDS win since 1997.

Both the Angels and the Royals, and the Tigers and the Orioles, met for the first time in the postseason.

The Royals went on to defeat the Orioles in the ALCS, then lost the 2014 World Series to the National League champion San Francisco Giants.

Matchups

Los Angeles Angels of Anaheim vs. Kansas City Royals

Baltimore Orioles vs. Detroit Tigers

Los Angeles vs. Kansas City

Game 1

Mike Moustakas, who is a native of Los Angeles, hit a  home run deep into right field in the 11th inning to give the Royals a 3–2 victory in Game 1. Closer Greg Holland, who arrived during the 4th inning following a trip to North Carolina for the birth of his son, pitched a perfect bottom half of the 11th to seal the Royals victory. Alcides Escobar had an RBI double in the third inning, allowing Moustakas to score, and Omar Infante's sacrifice fly allowed Alex Gordon to score in the fifth. The Angels' only scores were home runs from Chris Iannetta in the third and David Freese in the fifth.

This game also started a string of postseason games in which the Royals defense would make a number of highlight reel defensive plays.  Outfielders Lorenzo Cain and Nori Aoki each had a pair of great catches, which slowed down the Angels' high powered offense.

Game 2

Eric Hosmer hit a two-run homer and Salvador Pérez recorded an RBI infield single in the 11th inning, as the Royals won Game 2, 4–1. Kansas City scored first on Alex Gordon's RBI single in the second, but the Angels tied the game in the sixth with Albert Pujols' RBI single.

Kansas City again came up with a timely defensive gem.  In the bottom of the 8th with no outs and pinch runner Collin Cowgill at second base, Jarrod Dyson caught a fly ball to left-center field off of Chris Iannetta, and then threw picture perfect strike to Mike Moustakas at third to double-up Cowgill, who tried to advance on the play.

Game 3

The Angels' took their only lead of this series with a one out home run by Mike Trout in the top of the first off of James Shields, but C. J. Wilson gave up a triple in the bottom half to Alex Gordon and was immediately knocked out of the game. Eric Hosmer would add his second home run of this series, a two-run home run in the third off of Hector Santiago, to make it 5–1 Royals. The Angels cut it to 5–2 in the fourth on Albert Pujols's home run, but in the bottom of the inning, Mike Morin allowed a one-out home run to Mike Moustakas, then two singles to put runners on first and third before Lorenzo Cain's sacrifice fly made it 7–2 Royals. They made it 8–2 in the sixth off of Kevin Jepsen on Nori Aoki's RBI single that scored Omar Infante from second. The Angels scored the last run of the series in the eighth off of Wade Davis on Josh Hamilton's groundout with runners on second and third as the Royals completed a three-game sweep to punch their ticket to the 2014 ALCS. 

The defense again showed up for Kansas City.  The highlights of the game included back-to-back diving catches in the 5th inning by Lorenzo Cain with runners on base.

This is the Angels’ most recent postseason appearance to date.

Composite line score
2014 ALDS (3–0): Kansas City Royals over Los Angeles Angels of Anaheim

Baltimore vs. Detroit

Game 1

Nelson Cruz's two-run home run in the bottom of the first started the scoring for the Orioles. The Tigers tied the score in the top of the second on back-to-back home runs by Victor Martinez and J. D. Martinez, but Baltimore pulled ahead on an RBI single by Nick Markakis in the bottom half. The score remained unchanged until Baltimore scored in the seventh on a home run from J. J. Hardy to make the score 4–2. In the top of the eighth, Ian Kinsler singled off of Darren O'Day, but was doubled off of first on a line drive by Torii Hunter. The play proved to be critical as the next batter, Miguel Cabrera, homered. In the bottom half, after a one out double by Alejandro De Aza, Joba Chamberlain relieved starter Max Scherzer and a crucial error by Andrew Romine allowed De Aza to score and Adam Jones to reach base. Jones stole second, then scored on Nelson Cruz's single. Joakim Soria relieved Chamberlain and a single and intentional walk loaded the bases before Ryan Flaherty's single and Nick Hundley's groundout scored a run each, then Jonathan Schoop's double scored two more. Phil Coke relieved Soria and threw a wild pitch that moved Schoop to third, then walked Nick Markakis before De Aza, in his second at-bat of the inning, doubled to score both men. Baltimore scored a team postseason record and LDS record eight runs in the inning. This record would be tied the next day in the Cardinals/Dodgers NLDS series. With the game out of reach, Tommy Hunter came on and pitched out of a bases loaded jam to seal the game.

Game 2

Nick Markakis' two-run home run off Tiger starter Justin Verlander in the third put the Orioles on the board. But in the top of the fourth, Torii Hunter singled, Cabrera doubled him to third, Victor Martinez singled to score Hunter, J. D. Martinez homered to put Detroit on top 4–2 and Nick Castellanos homered to push the lead to three runs before the first out was recorded. After the next two outs were recorded, Rajai Davis singled and chased Baltimore starter Wei-Yin Chen in the process. Kevin Gausman came on and got the final out of the inning without further damage to keep the score 5–2. A two out RBI single by J. J. Hardy cut the score to 5–3 but Verlander escaped without another run crossing the plate. The score stayed at 5–3 until the top of the eighth when Victor Martinez doubled home Hunter to push the lead back to three runs. But for the second straight day Baltimore would fight back against the Tiger bullpen in the bottom of the eighth. Joba Chamberlain came on and got De Aza to ground out, but Adam Jones was hit by a pitch, Nelson Cruz singled Jones to second, and Steve Pearce singled in Jones to make it a 6–4 game. Joakim Soria came on in relief of Chamberlain and walked Hardy to load the bases for former Tiger Delmon Young. Young unloaded the bases with a go-ahead three-run double to put the Orioles back on top 7–6. Zach Britton came on and pitched a perfect ninth to send Baltimore to Detroit up two games to none.

Game 3

Adam Jones' single and Nelson Cruz's two-run home run that just stayed fair down the right field line off of David Price in the sixth broke a scoreless tie and the backs of the Tigers as Baltimore completed a three-game sweep. The Tigers got back-to-back leadoff doubles from Victor Martinez and J. D. Martinez in the ninth to pull within a run. After Bryan Holaday struck out, an intentional walk to Nick Castellanos put the winning run on base. Britton got Hernan Perez to ground into the game-ending, series-ending double play, sending the Orioles to their first ALCS appearance in 17 years. With the loss, the Tigers lost their first ever ALDS. In their previous four appearances they advanced to the ALCS every time. This is their last postseason appearance to date.

Composite line score
2014 ALDS (3–0): Baltimore Orioles over Detroit Tigers

References

External links
2014 MLB postseason schedule at ESPN

American League Division Series
American League Division Series
Baltimore Orioles postseason
Detroit Tigers postseason
Kansas City Royals postseason
Los Angeles Angels of Anaheim postseason
American League Division Series
American League Division Series
American League Division Series
American League Division Series
21st century in Anaheim, California
2010s in Baltimore
2014 in Detroit
Sports competitions in Detroit
2010s in Kansas City, Missouri
American League Division Series